Keeyow Lake (Lurish: سراو کیاو) is a natural lake in the northwest of Khorramabad in Lorestan Province, Iran.
The lake has a seven-hectare area and a depth of 3 to 7 meters. There is an amusement park as well as other recreational facilities next to the lake.
It is the only natural city lake in Iran and is a habitat for native and migratory birds and aquatic animals.

Gallery

References 

Khorramabad
Lakes of Iran
Landforms of Lorestan Province
Tourist attractions in Khorramabad